Minuscule 300 (in the Gregory-Aland numbering), A141 (Soden), is a Greek minuscule manuscript of the New Testament, on parchment. Palaeographically it has been assigned to the 11th century. 
It has marginalia.

Description 

The codex contains the text of the Gospel of Matthew, Gospel of Mark, Gospel of Luke on 328 parchment leaves, with a commentary. The text is written in one column per page, in 27-28 lines per page.

There is also another division according to the smaller Ammonian Sections (in Mark 237), with references to the Eusebian Canons (written below Ammonian Section numbers).

The biblical text is surrounded by a catena. On a margin were added, by a later hand, commentaries of Chrysostom's on Matthew, Victor's on Mark, and Titus of Bostra on Luke. Subscriptions to the first three Gospels are the same like that in codex 262. It has the famous Jerusalem Colophon.

Text 

The Greek text of the codex is a representative of the Byzantine text-type. Aland placed it in Category V.
It is close to the codex 20.

It was not examined by the Claremont Profile Method.

History 

The manuscript was added to the list of New Testament manuscripts by Scholz (1794-1852). 
It was collated by Scholz. It was examined and described by John Anthony Cramer, Paulin Martin, and W. F. Rose.

Formerly it was held in Fontainebleau.

The manuscript is currently housed at the Bibliothèque nationale de France (Gr. 186) at Paris.

See also 

 List of New Testament minuscules
 Biblical manuscript
 Textual criticism

References

Further reading 

 John Antony Cramer, Catenae Graecorum patrum in Novum Testamentum (Oxford 1844), Vol. 1, p. XXVII.
 Jean-Pierre-Paul Martin, Description technique des manuscrits grecs relatifs au Nouveau Testament, conservés dans les bibliothès de Paris (Paris 1883), p. 77.

Greek New Testament minuscules
11th-century biblical manuscripts
Bibliothèque nationale de France collections